Chad Michael Brown (born February 1970) is a Democrat from Plaquemine, Louisiana, who is a member of the Louisiana House of Representatives for District 60 in Iberville and Assumption parishes in the southern portion of his state.

Brown led a four-candidate field in the nonpartisan blanket primary held on October 24, 2015, for the right to succeed the term-limited Representative Karen St. Germain, also of Plaquemine. He polled 7,622 votes (47 percent). The runner-up, No Party candidate James Barker, received 4,240 votes (25.6 percent). Two other candidates, Republican Michael "Mike" Latino and another Democrat, Thomas Gerald Gaudet of Plaquemine (born November 1958), received 3,125 votes (18.8 percent) and 1,597 (9.6 percent), respectively.

In view of Brown's primary lead, Barker elected not to pursue a runoff election, which would have corresponded with the gubernatorial contest on November 21, 2015. Brown hence won the seat without a majority of the votes cast.

Brown studied at Louisiana State University in Baton Rouge. He is a former employee of the state Insurance Department in Texas and Baton Rouge.

References

 

 

1970 births
Living people
People from Plaquemine, Louisiana
Louisiana State University alumni
Democratic Party members of the Louisiana House of Representatives
21st-century American politicians